Nobel: The Enigmatic Alfred, His World and His Prize is a biographical book by Swedish journalist Ingrid Carlberg. It is her seventh book. It was shortlisted for the August Prize for Non-Fiction in 2019.

References

Swedish non-fiction books
Swedish-language novels
Swedish non-fiction literature
August Prize-winning works
Norstedts förlag books
Alfred Nobel